Eugenics is a fringe set of beliefs and practices that aim to improve the genetic quality of a human population. Historically, eugenicists have attempted to alter human gene pools by excluding people and groups judged to be inferior or promoting those judged to be superior. In recent years, the term has seen a revival in bioethical discussions on the usage of new technologies such as CRISPR and genetic screening, with a heated debate on whether these technologies should be called eugenics or not.

The concept predates the term; Plato suggested applying the principles of selective breeding to humans around 400 BC. Early advocates of eugenics in the 19th century regarded it as a way of improving groups of people. In contemporary usage, the term eugenics is closely associated with scientific racism. Modern bioethicists who advocate new eugenics characterize it as a way of enhancing individual traits, regardless of group membership.

While eugenic principles have been practiced as early as ancient Greece, the contemporary history of eugenics began in the late 19th century, when a popular eugenics movement emerged in the United Kingdom, and then spread to many countries, including the United States, Canada, Australia, and most European countries. In this period, people from across the political spectrum espoused eugenic ideas. Consequently, many countries adopted eugenic policies, intended to improve the quality of their populations' genetic stock. Such programs included both positive measures, such as encouraging individuals deemed particularly "fit" to reproduce, and negative measures, such as marriage prohibitions and forced sterilization of people deemed unfit for reproduction. Those deemed "unfit to reproduce" often included people with mental or physical disabilities, people who scored in the low ranges on different IQ tests, criminals and "deviants", and members of disfavored minority groups.

The eugenics movement became associated with Nazi Germany and the Holocaust when the defense of many of the defendants at the Nuremberg trials of 1945 to 1946 attempted to justify their human-rights abuses by claiming there was little difference between the Nazi eugenics programs and the U.S. eugenics programs. In the decades following World War II, with more emphasis on human rights, many countries began to abandon eugenics policies, although some Western countries (the United States, Canada, and Sweden among them) continued to carry out forced sterilizations. Since the 1980s and 1990s, with new assisted reproductive technology procedures available, such as gestational surrogacy (available since 1985), preimplantation genetic diagnosis (available since 1989), and cytoplasmic transfer (first performed in 1996), concern has grown about the possible revival of a more potent form of eugenics after decades of promoting human rights.

A criticism of eugenics policies is that, regardless of whether negative or positive policies are used, they are susceptible to abuse because the genetic selection criteria are determined by whichever group has political power at the time. Furthermore, many criticize negative eugenics in particular as a violation of basic human rights, seen since 1968's Proclamation of Tehran, as including the right to reproduce. Another criticism is that eugenics policies eventually lead to a loss of genetic diversity, thereby resulting in inbreeding depression due to a loss of genetic variation. Yet another criticism of contemporary eugenics policies is that they propose to permanently and artificially disrupt millions of years of human evolution, and that attempting to create genetic lines "clean" of "disorders" can have far-reaching ancillary downstream effects in the genetic ecology, including negative effects on immunity and on species resilience.

History

Origin and development

Types of eugenic practices have existed for millennia. Some indigenous peoples of Brazil are known to have practiced infanticide against children born with physical abnormalities since precolonial times. In ancient Greece, the philosopher Plato suggested selective mating to produce a guardian class. In Sparta, every Spartan child was inspected by the council of elders, the Gerousia, which determined if the child was fit to live or not.

The geographer Strabo states that the Samnites would take ten virgin women and ten young men who were considered to be the best representation of their sex and mate them. Following this, the best women would be given to the best male, then the second-best women to the second-best male. It is possible that the "best" men and women were chosen based on athletic capabilities. This would continue until all 20 people had been assigned to one another. If the people involved dishonored themselves, they were removed and forcefully separated from their partner.

In the early years of the Roman Republic, a Roman father was obliged by law to immediately kill his child if they were "dreadfully deformed". According to Tacitus, a Roman of the Imperial Period, the Germanic tribes of his day killed any member of their community they deemed cowardly, unwarlike or "stained with abominable vices", usually by drowning them in swamps. Modern historians, however, see Tacitus' ethnographic writing as unreliable in such details.

The idea of a modern project for improving the human population through selective breeding was originally developed by Francis Galton, and was initially inspired by Darwinism and its theory of natural selection. Galton had read his half-cousin Charles Darwin's theory of evolution, which sought to explain the development of plant and animal species, and desired to apply it to humans. Based on his biographical studies, Galton believed that desirable human qualities were hereditary traits, although Darwin strongly disagreed with this elaboration of his theory. In 1883, one year after Darwin's death, Galton gave his research a name: eugenics. With the introduction of genetics, eugenics became associated with genetic determinism, the belief that human character is entirely or in the majority caused by genes, unaffected by education or living conditions. Many of the early geneticists were not Darwinians, and evolution theory was not needed for eugenics policies based on genetic determinism. Throughout its recent history, eugenics has remained controversial.

Eugenics became an academic discipline at many colleges and universities and received funding from many sources. Organizations were formed to win public support and sway opinion towards responsible eugenic values in parenthood, including the British Eugenics Education Society of 1907 and the American Eugenics Society of 1921. Both sought support from leading clergymen and modified their message to meet religious ideals. In 1909, the Anglican clergymen William Inge and James Peile both wrote for the Eugenics Education Society. Inge was an invited speaker at the 1921 International Eugenics Conference, which was also endorsed by the Roman Catholic Archbishop of New York Patrick Joseph Hayes. The book The Passing of the Great Race (Or, The Racial Basis of European History) by American eugenicist, lawyer, and amateur anthropologist Madison Grant was published in 1916. Although influential, the book was largely ignored when it first appeared, and it went through several revisions and editions. Nevertheless, the book was used by people who advocated restricted immigration as justification for what became known as "scientific racism".

Three International Eugenics Conferences presented a global venue for eugenists with meetings in 1912 in London, and in 1921 and 1932 in New York City. Eugenic policies in the United States were first implemented in the early 1900s. It also took root in France, Germany, and Great Britain. Later, in the 1920s and 1930s, the eugenic policy of sterilizing certain mental patients was implemented in other countries including Belgium, Brazil, Canada, Japan and Sweden. Frederick Osborn's 1937 journal article "Development of a Eugenic Philosophy" framed it as a social philosophy—a philosophy with implications for social order. That definition is not universally accepted. Osborn advocated for higher rates of sexual reproduction among people with desired traits ("positive eugenics") or reduced rates of sexual reproduction or sterilization of people with less-desired or undesired traits ("negative eugenics").

In addition to being practiced in a number of countries, eugenics was internationally organized through the International Federation of Eugenics Organizations. Its scientific aspects were carried on through research bodies such as the Kaiser Wilhelm Institute of Anthropology, Human Heredity, and Eugenics, the Cold Spring Harbor Carnegie Institution for Experimental Evolution, and the Eugenics Record Office. Politically, the movement advocated measures such as sterilization laws. In its moral dimension, eugenics rejected the doctrine that all human beings are born equal and redefined moral worth purely in terms of genetic fitness. Its racist elements included pursuit of a pure "Nordic race" or "Aryan" genetic pool and the eventual elimination of "unfit" races. Many leading British politicians subscribed to the theories of eugenics. Winston Churchill supported the British Eugenics Society and was an honorary vice president for the organization. Churchill believed that eugenics could solve "race deterioration" and reduce crime and poverty.

Early critics of the philosophy of eugenics included the American sociologist Lester Frank Ward, the English writer G. K. Chesterton, the German-American anthropologist Franz Boas, who argued that advocates of eugenics greatly over-estimate the influence of biology, and Scottish tuberculosis pioneer and author Halliday Sutherland. Ward's 1913 article "Eugenics, Euthenics, and Eudemics", Chesterton's 1917 book Eugenics and Other Evils, and Boas' 1916 article "Eugenics" (published in The Scientific Monthly) were all harshly critical of the rapidly growing movement. Sutherland identified eugenists as a major obstacle to the eradication and cure of tuberculosis in his 1917 address "Consumption: Its Cause and Cure", and criticism of eugenists and Neo-Malthusians in his 1921 book Birth Control led to a writ for libel from the eugenist Marie Stopes. Several biologists were also antagonistic to the eugenics movement, including Lancelot Hogben. Other biologists such as J. B. S. Haldane and R. A. Fisher expressed skepticism in the belief that sterilization of "defectives" would lead to the disappearance of undesirable genetic traits.

Among institutions, the Catholic Church was an opponent of state-enforced sterilizations, but accepted isolating people with hereditary diseases so as not to let them reproduce. Attempts by the Eugenics Education Society to persuade the British government to legalize voluntary sterilization were opposed by Catholics and by the Labour Party. The American Eugenics Society initially gained some Catholic supporters, but Catholic support declined following the 1930 papal encyclical Casti connubii. In this, Pope Pius XI explicitly condemned sterilization laws: "Public magistrates have no direct power over the bodies of their subjects; therefore, where no crime has taken place and there is no cause present for grave punishment, they can never directly harm, or tamper with the integrity of the body, either for the reasons of eugenics or for any other reason."

As a social movement, eugenics reached its greatest popularity in the early decades of the 20th century, when it was practiced around the world and promoted by governments, institutions, and influential individuals (such as the playwright G. B. Shaw). Many countries enacted various eugenics policies, including: genetic screenings, birth control, promoting differential birth rates, marriage restrictions, segregation (both racial segregation and sequestering the mentally ill), compulsory sterilization, forced abortions or forced pregnancies, ultimately culminating in genocide. By 2014, gene selection (rather than "people selection") was made possible through advances in genome editing, leading to what is sometimes called new eugenics, also known as "neo-eugenics", "consumer eugenics", or "liberal eugenics"; which focuses on individual freedom and allegedly pull away from racism, sexism, heterosexism or a focus on intelligence.

Eugenics in the United States

Anti-miscegenation laws in the United States made it a crime for individuals to wed someone categorized as belonging to a different race. These laws were part of a broader policy of racial segregation in the United States to minimize contact between people of different ethnicities. Race laws and practices in the United States were explicitly used as models by the Nazi regime when it developed the Nuremberg Laws, stripping Jewish citizens of their citizenship.

Nazism and the decline of eugenics 

The scientific reputation of eugenics started to decline in the 1930s, a time when Ernst Rüdin used eugenics as a justification for the racial policies of Nazi Germany. Adolf Hitler had praised and incorporated eugenic ideas in Mein Kampf in 1925 and emulated eugenic legislation for the sterilization of "defectives" that had been pioneered in the United States once he took power. Some common early 20th century eugenics methods involved identifying and classifying individuals and their families, including the poor, mentally ill, blind, deaf, developmentally disabled, promiscuous women, homosexuals, and racial groups (such as the Roma and Jews in Nazi Germany) as "degenerate" or "unfit", and therefore led to segregation, institutionalization, sterilization, and even mass murder. The Nazi policy of identifying German citizens deemed mentally or physically unfit and then systematically killing them with poison gas, referred to as the Aktion T4 campaign, is understood by historians to have paved the way for the Holocaust.

By the end of World War II, many eugenics laws were abandoned, having become associated with Nazi Germany. H. G. Wells, who had called for "the sterilization of failures" in 1904, stated in his 1940 book The Rights of Man: Or What Are We Fighting For? that among the human rights, which he believed should be available to all people, was "a prohibition on mutilation, sterilization, torture, and any bodily punishment". After World War II, the practice of "imposing measures intended to prevent births within [a national, ethnical, racial or religious] group" fell within the definition of the new international crime of genocide, set out in the Convention on the Prevention and Punishment of the Crime of Genocide. The Charter of Fundamental Rights of the European Union also proclaims "the prohibition of eugenic practices, in particular those aiming at selection of persons". In spite of the decline in discriminatory eugenics laws, some government mandated sterilizations continued into the 21st century. During the ten years President Alberto Fujimori led Peru from 1990 to 2000, 2,000 persons were allegedly involuntarily sterilized. China maintained its one-child policy until 2015 as well as a suite of other eugenics based legislation to reduce population size and manage fertility rates of different populations. In 2007, the United Nations reported coercive sterilizations and hysterectomies in Uzbekistan. During the years 2005 to 2013, nearly one-third of the 144 California prison inmates who were sterilized did not give lawful consent to the operation.

Modern eugenics
Developments in genetic, genomic, and reproductive technologies at the beginning of the 21st century have raised numerous questions regarding the ethical status of eugenics, effectively creating a resurgence of interest in the subject. Some, such as UC Berkeley sociologist Troy Duster, have argued that modern genetics is a back door to eugenics. This view was shared by then-White House Assistant Director for Forensic Sciences, Tania Simoncelli, who stated in a 2003 publication by the Population and Development Program at Hampshire College that advances in pre-implantation genetic diagnosis (PGD) are moving society to a "new era of eugenics", and that, unlike the Nazi eugenics, modern eugenics is consumer driven and market based, "where children are increasingly regarded as made-to-order consumer products". In a 2006 newspaper article, Richard Dawkins said that discussion regarding eugenics was inhibited by the shadow of Nazi misuse, to the extent that some scientists would not admit that breeding humans for certain abilities is at all possible. He believes that it is not physically different from breeding domestic animals for traits such as speed or herding skill. Dawkins felt that enough time had elapsed to at least ask just what the ethical differences were between breeding for ability versus training athletes or forcing children to take music lessons, though he could think of persuasive reasons to draw the distinction.

Lee Kuan Yew, the founding father of Singapore, promoted eugenics as late as 1983. A proponent of nature over nurture, he stated that "intelligence is 80% nature and 20% nurture", and attributed the successes of his children to genetics. In his speeches, Lee urged highly educated women to have more children, claiming that "social delinquents" would dominate unless their fertility rate increased. In 1984, Singapore began providing financial incentives to highly educated women to encourage them to have more children. In 1985, incentives were significantly reduced after public uproar.

In October 2015, the United Nations' International Bioethics Committee wrote that the ethical problems of human genetic engineering should not be confused with the ethical problems of the 20th century eugenics movements. However, it is still problematic because it challenges the idea of human equality and opens up new forms of discrimination and stigmatization for those who do not want, or cannot afford, the technology.

The National Human Genome Research Institute says that eugenics is "inaccurate", "scientifically erroneous and immoral".

Transhumanism is often associated with eugenics, although most transhumanists holding similar views nonetheless distance themselves from the term "eugenics" (preferring "germinal choice" or "reprogenetics") to avoid having their position confused with the discredited theories and practices of early-20th-century eugenic movements.

Prenatal screening has been called by some a contemporary form of eugenics because it may lead to abortions of fetuses with undesirable traits. 

A system was proposed by California State Senator Nancy Skinner to compensate victims of the well-documented examples of prison sterilizations resulting from California's eugenics programs, but this did not pass by the bill's 2018 deadline in the Legislature.

Meanings and types

The term eugenics and its modern field of study were first formulated by Francis Galton in 1883, drawing on the recent work of his half-cousin Charles Darwin. Galton published his observations and conclusions in his book Inquiries into Human Faculty and Its Development.

The origins of the concept began with certain interpretations of Mendelian inheritance and the theories of August Weismann. The word eugenics is derived from the Greek word eu ("good" or "well") and the suffix -genēs ("born"); Galton intended it to replace the word "stirpiculture", which he had used previously but which had come to be mocked due to its perceived sexual overtones. Galton defined eugenics as "the study of all agencies under human control which can improve or impair the racial quality of future generations".

Historically, the idea of eugenics has been used to argue for a broad array of practices ranging from prenatal care for mothers deemed genetically desirable to the forced sterilization and murder of those deemed unfit. To population geneticists, the term has included the avoidance of inbreeding without altering allele frequencies; for example, J. B. S. Haldane wrote that "the motor bus, by breaking up inbred village communities, was a powerful eugenic agent." Debate as to what exactly counts as eugenics continues today.

Edwin Black, journalist, historian, and author of War Against the Weak, argues that eugenics is often deemed a pseudoscience because what is defined as a genetic improvement of a desired trait is a cultural choice rather than a matter that can be determined through objective scientific inquiry. Black states the following about the pseudocientific past of eugenics: "As American eugenic pseudoscience thoroughly infused the scientific journals of the first three decades of the twentieth century, Nazi-era eugenics placed its unmistakable stamp on the medical literature of the twenties, thirties and forties."   Black says that eugenics was the pseudoscience aimed at "improving" the human race, used by Adolf Hitler to "try to legitimize his anti- Semitism by medicalizing it, and wrapping it in the more palatable pseudoscientific facade of eugenics."

The most disputed aspect of eugenics has been the definition of "improvement" of the human gene pool, such as what is a beneficial characteristic and what is a defect. Historically, this aspect of eugenics was tainted with scientific racism and pseudoscience.

Early eugenicists were mostly concerned with factors of perceived intelligence that often correlated strongly with social class. These included Karl Pearson and Walter Weldon, who worked on this at the University College London. In his lecture "Darwinism, Medical Progress and Eugenics", Pearson claimed that everything concerning eugenics fell into the field of medicine.

Eugenic policies have been conceptually divided into two categories. Positive eugenics is aimed at encouraging reproduction among the genetically advantaged; for example, the reproduction of the intelligent, the healthy, and the successful. Possible approaches include financial and political stimuli, targeted demographic analyses, in vitro fertilization, egg transplants, and cloning. Negative eugenics aimed to eliminate, through sterilization or segregation, those deemed physically, mentally, or morally "undesirable". This includes abortions, sterilization, and other methods of family planning. Both positive and negative eugenics can be coercive; in Nazi Germany, for example, abortion was illegal for women deemed by the state to be fit.

Controversy over scientific and moral legitimacy

Arguments for scientific validity
The first major challenge to conventional eugenics based on genetic inheritance was made in 1915 by Thomas Hunt Morgan. He demonstrated the event of genetic mutation occurring outside of inheritance involving the discovery of the hatching of a fruit fly (Drosophila melanogaster) with white eyes from a family with red eyes, demonstrating that major genetic changes occurred outside of inheritance. Additionally, Morgan criticized the view that certain traits, such as intelligence and criminality, were hereditary because these traits were subjective. Despite Morgan's public rejection of eugenics, much of his genetic research was adopted by proponents of eugenics.

The heterozygote test is used for the early detection of recessive hereditary diseases, allowing for couples to determine if they are at risk of passing genetic defects to a future child. The goal of the test is to estimate the likelihood of passing the hereditary disease to future descendants.

There are examples of eugenic acts that managed to lower the prevalence of recessive diseases, although not influencing the prevalence of heterozygote carriers of those diseases. The elevated prevalence of certain genetically transmitted diseases among the Ashkenazi Jewish population (Tay–Sachs, cystic fibrosis, Canavan's disease, and Gaucher's disease), has been decreased in current populations by the application of genetic screening.

Pleiotropy occurs when one gene influences multiple, seemingly unrelated phenotypic traits, an example being phenylketonuria, which is a human disease that affects multiple systems but is caused by one gene defect. Andrzej Pękalski, from the University of Wrocław, argues that eugenics can cause harmful loss of genetic diversity if a eugenics program selects a pleiotropic gene that could possibly be associated with a positive trait. Pekalski uses the example of a coercive government eugenics program that prohibits people with myopia from breeding but has the unintended consequence of also selecting against high intelligence since the two go together.

Objections to scientific validity 
Eugenic policies may lead to a loss of genetic diversity. Further, a culturally-accepted "improvement" of the gene pool may result in extinction, due to increased vulnerability to disease, reduced ability to adapt to environmental change, and other factors that may not be anticipated in advance. This has been evidenced in numerous instances, in isolated island populations. A long-term, species-wide eugenics plan might lead to such a scenario because the elimination of traits deemed undesirable would reduce genetic diversity by definition.

While the science of genetics has increasingly provided means by which certain characteristics and conditions can be identified and understood, given the complexity of human genetics, culture, and psychology, at this point there is no agreed objective means of determining which traits might be ultimately desirable or undesirable. Some conditions such as sickle-cell disease and cystic fibrosis respectively confer immunity to malaria and resistance to cholera when a single copy of the recessive allele is contained within the genotype of the individual, so eliminating these genes is undesirable in places where such diseases are common.

Ethical controversies

Societal and political consequences of eugenics call for a place in the discussion on the ethics behind the eugenics movement. Many of the ethical concerns regarding eugenics arise from its controversial past, prompting a discussion on what place, if any, it should have in the future. Advances in science have changed eugenics. In the past, eugenics had more to do with sterilization and enforced reproduction laws. Now, in the age of a progressively mapped genome, embryos can be tested for susceptibility to disease, gender, and genetic defects, and alternative methods of reproduction such as in vitro fertilization are becoming more common. Therefore, eugenics is no longer ex post facto regulation of the living but instead preemptive action on the unborn.

With this change, however, there are ethical concerns which some groups feel warrant more attention before this practice is commonly rolled out. Sterilized individuals, for example, could volunteer for the procedure, albeit under incentive or duress, or at least voice their opinion. The unborn fetus on which these new eugenic procedures are performed cannot speak out, as the fetus lacks the voice to consent or to express their opinion. Philosophers disagree about the proper framework for reasoning about such actions, which change the very identity and existence of future persons.

Opposition

Edwin Black has described potential "eugenics wars" as the worst-case outcome of eugenics. In his view, this scenario would mean the return of coercive state-sponsored genetic discrimination and human rights violations such as the compulsory sterilization of persons with genetic defects, the killing of the institutionalized and, specifically, the segregation and genocide of races which are considered inferior. Law professors George Annas and Lori Andrews have argued that the use of these technologies could lead to such human-posthuman caste warfare.

Environmental ethicist Bill McKibben argued against germinal choice technology and other advanced biotechnological strategies for human enhancement. He writes that it would be morally wrong for humans to tamper with fundamental aspects of themselves (or their children) in an attempt to overcome universal human limitations, such as vulnerability to aging, maximum life span and biological constraints on physical and cognitive ability. Attempts to "improve" themselves through such manipulation would remove limitations that provide a necessary context for the experience of meaningful human choice. He claims that human lives would no longer seem meaningful in a world where such limitations could be overcome with technology. Even the goal of using germinal choice technology for clearly therapeutic purposes should be relinquished, he argues, since it would inevitably produce temptations to tamper with such things as cognitive capacities. He argues that it is possible for societies to benefit from renouncing particular technologies, using Ming China, Tokugawa Japan and the contemporary Amish as examples.

Amanda Caleb, Professor of Medical Humanities at Geisinger Commonwealth School of Medicine, says "Eugenic laws and policies are now understood as part of a specious devotion to a pseudoscience that actively dehumanizes to support political agendas and not true science or medicine."

Endorsement
Some, for example Nathaniel C. Comfort from Johns Hopkins University, claim that the change from state-led reproductive-genetic decision-making to individual choice has moderated the worst abuses of eugenics by transferring the decision-making process from the state to patients and their families. Comfort suggests that "the eugenic impulse drives us to eliminate disease, live longer and healthier, with greater intelligence, and a better adjustment to the conditions of society; and the health benefits, the intellectual thrill and the profits of genetic bio-medicine are too great for us to do otherwise." Others, such as bioethicist Stephen Wilkinson of Keele University and Honorary Research Fellow Eve Garrard at the University of Manchester, claim that some aspects of modern genetics can be classified as eugenics, but that this classification does not inherently make modern genetics immoral.

In their book published in 2000, From Chance to Choice: Genetics and Justice, bioethicists Allen Buchanan, Dan Brock, Norman Daniels and Daniel Wikler argued that liberal societies have an obligation to encourage as wide an adoption of eugenic enhancement technologies as possible (so long as such policies do not infringe on individuals' reproductive rights or exert undue pressures on prospective parents to use these technologies) in order to maximize public health and minimize the inequalities that may result from both natural genetic endowments and unequal access to genetic enhancements.

In his book A Theory of Justice (1971), American philosopher John Rawls argued that "Over time a society is to take steps to preserve the general level of natural abilities and to prevent the diffusion of serious defects". The original position, a hypothetical situation developed by Rawls, has been used as an argument for negative eugenics.

In science fiction 
The novel Brave New World (1931) is a dystopian social science fiction novel by the English author Aldous Huxley, set in a futuristic World State, whose citizens are environmentally engineered into an intelligence-based social hierarchy.

The film Gattaca (1997) provides a fictional example of a dystopian society that uses eugenics to decide what people are capable of and their place in the world. Though Gattaca was not a box office success, it was critically acclaimed and is said to have crystallized the debate over the controversial topic of human genetic engineering. The film's dystopian depiction of "genoism" has been cited by many bioethicists and laypeople in support of their hesitancy about, or opposition to, eugenics and the societal acceptance of the genetic-determinist ideology that may frame it. In a 1997 review of the film for the journal Nature Genetics, molecular biologist Lee M. Silver stated that "Gattaca is a film that all geneticists should see if for no other reason than to understand the perception of our trade held by so many of the public-at-large". In his 2018 book Blueprint, behavioural geneticist Robert Plomin writes that while Gattaca warned of the dangers of genetic information being used by a totalitarian state, genetic testing could also favour better meritocracy in democratic societies which already administer psychological tests to select people for education and employment. Plomin suggests that polygenic scores might supplement testing in a manner that is free of biases.

Various works by author Robert A. Heinlein mention The Howard Foundation, a group aimed at improving human longevity through selective breeding.

See also

 
 
 
 
 
 
 
 
 
 
 
 
 
 

Citations

General and cited references

Histories of eugenics (academic accounts)
 
 
 
 
 
 Leon, Sharon M. (2013). An Image of God: The Catholic Struggle with Eugenics. Chicago: University of Chicago Press.
 
 
 Stepan, Nancy Leys (1991). "The Hour of Eugenics": Race, Gender, and Nation in Latin America. Ithaca: Cornell University Press.

Histories of hereditarian thought

Criticisms of eugenics

External links

 Eugenics: Its Origin and Development (1883–Present) by the National Human Genome Research Institute (November 30, 2021)
 Eugenics and Scientific Racism Fact Sheet by the National Human Genome Research Institute (November 3, 2021)

 
Ableism
Applied genetics
Bioethics
Ethically disputed medical practices
Nazism
Pseudo-scholarship
Pseudoscience
Racism
Technological utopianism
White supremacy